The Uganda Electricity Transmission Company Limited (UETCL) is a parastatal company whose primary purpose is to make bulk electricity purchases and transmit the electricity along high voltage wires to local and foreign distribution points. UETCL is the sole authorized national bulk energy purchaser and the sole authorized electricity importer and exporter in Uganda.

Location
The headquarters of UETCL are at 10 Hannington Road on Nakasero Hill in Kampala, Uganda's capital and largest city. The coordinates of the company headquarters are 0°19'13.0"N 32°35'12.5"E (Latitude:0.320278; Longitude:32.586806).

History
The company was established in 2001 by an act of the Ugandan parliament following the break-up of the defunct Uganda Electricity Board. UETCL began operations on 1 April 2001.

Operations
UETCL is responsible for the development, operations, maintenance, and improvement of the high-voltage power transmission lines, above 33kV, in Uganda. It also owns and operates the high-voltage substations (above 33kV), around the country. UETCL is wholly owned by the Ministry of Finance, Planning and Economic Development and is regulated by the Ugandan Ministry of Energy & Mineral Development.

Power loss reduction
To reduce electricity transmission losses in the country, UETCL has borrowed US$100 million (UGX:337 billion) from Exim Bank of China to construct four mega substations. The installations will feed the industrial parks at Luzira, Namanve, Mukono, and Iganga. The work was expected to be complete in 2019.

Controversy
In March 2022, the company chairman at that time, Peter Ucanda resigned, citing bad Ugandan media coverage of him personally and of the company. About one month later, the parent Ministry of Finance, Planning and Economic Development fired the entire seven-person board, save for one member, the company secretary. Reasons cited for the dismissals include alleged "fraud and abuse of office at the company". A new board of directors has been appointed but had not been sworn in yet as of 29 April 2022.

New board members
In June 2022, Ruth Nankabirwa, the incumbent Minister of Energy and Minerals, introduced and swore in a new board of directors for the company. The new board members are: 1. Kwame Ejalu: Chairman 2. Sharon Achiro 3. Innocent Oboko Yotkum 4. Sylvia Muheebwa Nabatanzi 5. Cecilia Nakiranda 6. Julius Mukooli and 7. Michael Taremwa Kananura: Acting Managing Director/CEO.

See also

Umeme
Energy in Uganda
Uganda Electricity Generation Company Limited
Electricity Regulatory Authority
List of power stations in Uganda

References

External links
 UETCL Homepage
 Uganda: Electricity Firms Face Staffing Challenges As of 7 September 2015.
 Land Owners hampering power grid extension - UETCL As of 10 March 2022.

Energy companies of Uganda
Electric power infrastructure in Uganda
Energy companies established in 2001
Government-owned companies of Uganda
Electric power companies of Uganda
2001 establishments in Uganda